James Hooper (born 10 February 1997) is an English semi-professional footballer who plays as a forward for Runcorn Linnets. He appeared in the Football League for Rochdale and Carlisle United.

Playing career

Rochdale
Hooper turned professional at Rochdale in April 2015. He scored 23 goals at youth team level in the 2014–15 season and was named as youth team Player of the Season, which reportedly attracted interested from Norwich City. He made his debut in the Football League on 24 November, coming on for Donal McDermott 54 minutes into a 2–0 defeat to Gillingham at Priestfield Stadium.

Loans to FC United of Manchester and Stockport County
During his time at Rochdale he spent time on loan at both FC United and Stockport County.

Carlisle United
In March 2017 he joined Carlisle United on a short-term deal.

FC United of Manchester
He then joined FC United.

Radcliffe Borough
In 2017 he signed for Radcliffe Borough. He finished top goal scorer for Radcliffe in 2018 scoring 17 goals.

Salford City
In July 2018 after appearing on trial for the club a number of times in pre-season friendlies, he signed on a one-year contract for Salford City.

Chorley
In November 2018 he moved to Chorley.

Radcliffe
In September 2019 he moved to Radcliffe.

West Didsbury & Chorlton
After breaking his collarbone, he joined West Didsbury & Chorlton in January 2020 to regain his fitness, and scored three goals in three games with the club.

Altrincham
In February 2020 he joined Altrincham on non-contract terms.

Witton Albion
In February 2020 he joined Witton Albion on dual registration terms and then joined the club on a permanent deal in August 2020.

Atherton Collieries
In February 2022 he joined Atherton Collieries.

Workington
On 26 July 2022, Hooper signed for Workington.

Career statistics

References

External links
 
 

1997 births
Living people
Footballers from Manchester
People from Wythenshawe
English footballers
Association football forwards
Rochdale A.F.C. players
F.C. United of Manchester players
Carlisle United F.C. players
Radcliffe F.C. players
Stockport County F.C. players
Salford City F.C. players
Chorley F.C. players
Witton Albion F.C. players
Altrincham F.C. players
West Didsbury & Chorlton A.F.C. players
Atherton Collieries A.F.C. players
Workington A.F.C. players
English Football League players
National League (English football) players
Northern Premier League players